Alejandra Chellew is a Chilean artistic businesswoman. One of the most important female leaders in the country, being selected among the 50 most important leaders in the country in 2005. She is a co founder of La Sala gallery, investing a lot of effort and resources supporting Chilean young talents.

External links
  www.redlideres.cl/1813/article-70673.html
  www.terra.cl/zonamujer/index.cfm?id_cat=1372&id_reg=979577
  www.puntomujer.emol.com/mujer_y_trabajo/noticia/detallenoticia.asp?id=%7B8C0148F7-D388-407A-A56C-73B8D995E030%7D%3C
  www.mujeresempresarias.cl/nota_0014.php

Chilean businesspeople
Living people
Year of birth missing (living people)